Wars & Warriors: Joan of Arc is a historically based computer game. Developed and published by Enlight, it was released in 2004. The player assumes the persona of Joan of Arc and leads the French in their attempt to win the Hundred Years' War. The game combines aspects of real-time strategy and action.

Gameplay
While the game has both action and strategy aspects, action predominates. Playing as Joan or one of several other French commanders, the player uses a variety of weapons to defeat enemy English soldiers. As the game progresses, the player gains combos and special attacks that enable him or her to defeat the English more effectively. The player also controls the French army and directs it in battle. There are eight levels, each featuring multiple objectives.

Development
The game was in development for more than a year.

Reception

The game received "mixed" reviews according to the review aggregation website Metacritic. PC Gamer said that it "deserves the same fate as its namesake".

References

External links
Official website 

2004 video games
Cancelled Xbox games
Real-time strategy video games
Video games scored by Jason Graves
Video games developed in China
Windows games
Windows-only games